In statistical mechanics, the two-dimensional square lattice Ising model is a simple lattice model of interacting magnetic spins. The model is notable for having nontrivial interactions, yet having an analytical solution. The model was solved by Lars Onsager  for the special case that the external magnetic field H = 0. An analytical solution for the general case for  has yet to be found.

Defining the partition function
Consider a 2D Ising model on a square lattice  with N sites and periodic boundary conditions in both the horizontal and vertical directions, which effectively reduces the topology of the model to a    torus.  Generally, the horizontal coupling  the vertical one . With  and absolute temperature  and Boltzmann's constant , the partition function

Critical temperature
The critical temperature  can be obtained from the  Kramers–Wannier duality relation.

where 

Assuming there is only one critical line in the (K,L) plane, the duality relation implies that this is given by:

For the isotropic case , one finds the famous relation for the critical temperature

Dual lattice

Consider a configuration of spins  on the square lattice . Let r and s denote the number of unlike neighbours in the vertical and horizontal directions respectively.

Construct a dual lattice  as depicted in the diagram. For every configuration , a polygon is associated to the lattice by drawing a line on the edge of the dual lattice if the spins separated by the edge are unlike. Since by traversing a vertex of  the spins need to change an even number of times so that one arrives at the starting point with the same charge, every vertex of the dual lattice is connected to an even number of lines in the configuration, defining a polygon. 

This reduces the partition function to

summing over all polygons in the dual lattice, where r and s are the number of horizontal and vertical lines in the polygon, with the factor of 2 arising from the inversion of spin configuration.

Low-temperature expansion

High-temperature expansion

Since  one has

Therefore

Since there are N horizontal and vertical edges, there are a total of  terms in the expansion. Summing over the configurations, using

shows that only configurations with an even number of lines at each vertex (polygons) will contribute to the partition function, giving

where the sum is over all polygons in the lattice.

The two expansions can be related using the Kramers–Wannier duality.

Exact solution
The free energy per site in the limit  is given as follows. Define the parameter  as

The Helmholtz free energy per site  can be expressed as

For the isotropic case , from the above expression one finds for the internal energy per site:

Notes

References

 
 
 
 
 

 Barry M. McCoy and Tai Tsun Wu (1973), The Two-Dimensional Ising Model. Harvard University Press, Cambridge Massachusetts, 

 
 John Palmer (2007), Planar Ising Correlations. Birkhäuser, Boston, .

Statistical mechanics
Exactly solvable models
Lattice models